Sayansk is a town in Irkutsk Oblast, Russia, located on the Oka River (Angara River's basin)  northwest of Irkutsk. Population:

History
Sayansk was founded in 1970. It was granted urban-type settlement status in 1975 and town status in 1985.

Administrative and municipal status
Within the framework of administrative divisions, it is incorporated as the Town of Sayansk—an administrative unit with the status equal to that of the districts. As a municipal division, the Town of Sayansk is incorporated as Sayansk Urban Okrug.

References

Notes

Sources

Cities and towns in Irkutsk Oblast
Cities and towns built in the Soviet Union
Populated places established in 1970